Leonel Dante Álvarez (born 25 March 1996) is an Argentine professional footballer who plays as a midfielder for San Martín SJ.

Career
Álvarez made his professional debut with Ferro Carril Oeste of Primera B Nacional in 2016, coming on as a late substitute in a 2–2 draw with Brown on 21 March. Eleven more appearances followed in his first season of 2016, prior to fourteen appearances in 2016–17. Álvarez was loaned to Primera B Metropolitana's Flandria in July 2018. He remained for the next two seasons, making fifty-two appearances and scoring two goals; against All Boys and Acassuso respectively. In August 2020, Álvarez signed for Primera B Nacional's Guillermo Brown on a free transfer.

After a spell at Belgrano in 2021, Álvarez moved to Primera Nacional club San Martín de San Juan ahead of the 2022 season.

Career statistics
.

References

External links

1996 births
Living people
Sportspeople from Jujuy Province
Argentine footballers
Association football midfielders
Primera Nacional players
Primera B Metropolitana players
Ferro Carril Oeste footballers
Flandria footballers
Guillermo Brown de Puerto Madryn footballers
Club Atlético Belgrano footballers
San Martín de San Juan footballers